Executive Order 6102 is an executive order signed on April 5, 1933, by US President Franklin D. Roosevelt "forbidding the hoarding of gold coin, gold bullion, and gold certificates within the continental United States." The executive order was made under the authority of the Trading with the Enemy Act of 1917, as amended by the Emergency Banking Act in March 1933.

Rationale
The stated reason for the order was that hard times had caused "hoarding" of gold, stalling economic growth and worsening the depression as the US was then using  the gold standard for its currency.

On April 6, 1933, The New York Times wrote, under the headline Hoarding of Gold, "The Executive Order issued by the President yesterday amplifies and particularizes his earlier warnings against hoarding. On March 6, taking advantage of a wartime statute that had not been repealed, he issued Presidential Proclamation 2039 that forbade the hoarding 'of gold or silver coin or bullion or currency', under penalty of $10,000 fine or ten years' imprisonment or both."

The main rationale behind the order was actually to remove the constraint on the Federal Reserve preventing it from increasing the money supply during the depression. The Federal Reserve Act (1913) required 40% gold backing of Federal Reserve Notes that were issued. By the late 1920s, the Federal Reserve had almost reached the limit of allowable credit, in the form of Federal Reserve demand notes, which could be backed by the gold in its possession (see Great Depression).

Effects
Executive Order 6102 required all persons to deliver on or before May 1, 1933, all but a small amount of gold coin, gold bullion, and gold certificates owned by them to the Federal Reserve in exchange for $20.67 per troy ounce. Under the Trading with the Enemy Act of 1917, as amended by the recently passed Emergency Banking Act of March 9, 1933, a violation of the order was punishable by fine up to $10,000, up to ten years in prison, or both.

The order specifically exempted "customary use in industry, profession or art," a provision that covered artists, jewelers, dentists, sign-makers, etc. The same paragraph also exempted "gold coins having recognized special value to collectors of rare and unusual coins", which protected recognized gold coin collections from legal seizure.

The 1934 Gold Reserve Act subsequently changed the statutory gold content of the U.S. Dollar from $20.67 to $35 an ounce.  While this might be seen to some as a move that increased the value of gold, it actually merely devalued the U.S. Dollar so that less gold was required to back U.S. Currency, and the Federal Reserve was free to print more paper money.  All international transactions by the U.S. Treasury were afterward calculated with the new valuation for gold at $35 an ounce. The resulting profit that the federal government realized funded the Exchange Stabilization Fund, also established by the Gold Reserve Act.

The regulations prescribed in the executive order were modified by Executive Order 6111 on April 20, 1933, both of which were ultimately revoked and superseded by Executive Orders 6260 and 6261 on August 28 and 29, 1933, respectively.

Executive Order 6102 also led to the extreme rarity of the 1933 Double Eagle gold coin. The order caused all gold coin production to cease and all 1933 minted coins to be destroyed. About 20 such coins were stolen, leading to an outstanding US Secret Service warrant for arrest and confiscation of the coins. A legalized surviving coin sold for over $7.5 million in 2002, making it one of the most valuable coins in the world.

Prosecutions
Numerous individuals and companies were prosecuted related to Roosevelt's Executive Order 6102. The prosecutions took place under the subsequent Executive Orders 6111, 6260, 6261 and the Gold Reserve Act of 1934.

There was a need to strengthen Executive Order 6102, as the one prosecution under the order was ruled invalid by Federal Judge John M. Woolsey, on the grounds that the order was signed by the President, instead of the Secretary of the Treasury as required.

When Campbell attempted to withdraw the gold, Chase refused, and Campbell sued Chase. A federal prosecutor then indicted Campbell on the following day (September 27, 1933) for failing to surrender his gold. Ultimately, the prosecution of Campbell failed, but the authority of the federal government to seize gold was upheld, and Campbell's gold was confiscated.

The case was cause for the Roosevelt administration to issue a new order under the signature of the Secretary of the Treasury, Henry Morgenthau, Jr., Executive Orders 6260, 6261, related to the seizure of gold and the prosecution of gold hoarders. A few months later, Congress passed the Gold Reserve Act of 1934, which ratified Roosevelt's orders. A new set of Treasury regulations was issued providing civil penalties of confiscation of all gold and imposition of fines equal to double the value of the gold seized.

Prosecutions of US citizens and noncitizens followed the new orders, with a few notable cases:

Gus Farber, a diamond and jewelry merchant from San Francisco, was prosecuted for the sale of thirteen $20 gold coins without a license. Secret Service agents discovered the sale with the help of the buyer. Farber, his father, and 12 others were arrested in four American cities after a sting operation conducted by the Secret Service. The arrests took place simultaneously in New York and three California cities: San Francisco, San Jose, and Oakland. Morris Anolik was arrested in New York with $5,000 in U.S. and foreign gold coins; Dan Levin and Edward Friedman of San Jose were arrested with $15,000 in gold; Sam Nankin was arrested in Oakland; in San Francisco, nine men were arrested on charges of hoarding gold. In all, $24,000 in gold was seized by Secret Service Agents during the operation.

David Baraban and his son Jacob owned a refining company. The Barabans' license to deal in unmelted scrap gold was revoked and so the Barabans operated their refining business under a license issued to a Minnie Sarch. The Barabans admitted that Minnie Sarch had nothing to do with the business and that she had obtained the license so that the Barabans could continue to deal in gold. The Barabans had a cigar box full of gold-filled scrap jewelry visible in one of the showcases. Government agents raided the Barabans' business and found another hidden box of US and foreign gold coins. The coins were seized and Baraban was charged with conspiracy to defraud the United States.

Louis Ruffino was one individual indicted on three counts purporting to violations of the Trading with the Enemy Act of 1917, which restricted trade with countries hostile to the United States. Eventually, Ruffino appealed the conviction to the Circuit Court of Appeals 9th District in 1940; however, the judgment of the lower courts was upheld based on the President's executive orders and the Gold Reserve Act of 1934. Ruffino, a resident of Sutter Creek in California-gold country, was convicted of possessing 78 ounces of gold and was sentenced to 6 months in jail, paid a $500 fine, and had his gold seized.

Foreigners also had gold confiscated and were forced to accept paper money for their gold. The Uebersee Finanz-Korporation, a Swiss banking company, had $1,250,000 in gold coins for business use. The Uebersee Finanz-Korporation entrusted the gold to an American firm for safekeeping, and the Swiss were shocked to find that their gold was confiscated. The Swiss made appeals, but they were denied; they were entitled to paper money but not their gold. The Swiss company would have lost 40% of their gold's value if they had tried to buy the same amount of gold with the paper money that they received in exchange for their confiscated gold.

Another type of de facto gold seizure occurred as a result of the various executive orders involving bonds, gold certificates and private contracts. Private contracts or bonds that were written in terms of gold were to be paid in paper currency instead of gold although all of the contracts and the bonds proclaimed that they were payable in gold, and at least one, the fourth Liberty Bond, was a federal instrument. The plaintiffs in all cases received paper money, instead of gold, despite the contracts' terms. The contracts and the bonds were written precisely to avoid currency debasement by requiring payment in gold coin. The paper money which was redeemable in gold was instead irredeemable based on Nortz v. United States, . The consolidated Gold Clause Cases were the following:
Perry v. United States, 
U.S. v. Bankers' Trust Co., 294 U.S. 240 (1935)
Norman v. Baltimore & Ohio R. Co., 
Nortz v. United States, 

The Supreme Court upheld all seizures as constitutional, with Justices James Clark McReynolds, Willis Van Devanter, George Sutherland, and Pierce Butler dissenting. The four justices were labelled the "Four Horsemen" by the press, as their conservative views were in opposition to Roosevelt's New Deal supported by the press.

Subsequent events and abrogation
The Gold Reserve Act of 1934 made contractual gold clauses unenforceable.  It also allowed the President to change the gold content of the US dollar by proclamation. Immediately following its passage, Roosevelt changed the gold content of the dollar from $20.67 to $35 per ounce, thereby devaluing US federal reserve notes, which were backed on gold. That valuation remained in effect until August 15, 1971, when President Richard Nixon announced that the US would no longer value the US dollar with a fixed amount of gold, thus abandoning the gold standard for foreign exchange (see Nixon Shock).

The private ownership of gold certificates was legalized in 1964, and they can be openly owned by collectors but are not redeemable in gold. However, P. L. 93-373 did not repeal the Gold Repeal Joint Resolution, which banned any contracts that specified payment in a fixed amount of money as gold or a fixed amount of gold. That is, contracts remained unenforceable if they used gold monetarily, rather than as a commodity of trade. However, an Act enacted on Oct. 28, 1977, Pub. L. No. 95-147, § 4(c), 91 Stat. 1227, 1229 (originally codified at 31 U.S.C. § 463 note, recodified as amended at 31 U.S.C. § 5118(d)(2)) amended the 1933 Joint Resolution to make it clear that parties could again include so-called gold clauses in contracts made after 1977.

Hoax of safe deposit box seizures
According to a hoax, Roosevelt ordered all safe deposit boxes in the country seized and searched for gold by an official of the Internal Revenue Service. A typical example of the text of the alleged order reads:

The first known reference to the hoax was in the book After the Crash: Life In the New Great Depression. The fake text refers only to gold, not to silver, which was added by 1998 to Internet references. It claims to be an executive order, but its text was written it to apply to specific individuals ("Your possession"), and so if the text originated from the government, it would have been sent to individuals, not published as an executive order. The first paragraph starts with the actual text of Executive Order 6102, then edits it slightly (changing "said national emergency" to "a national emergency" and "still continues to exist" to "still exists") and then adds invented text. The minor edits and the way that the real text and fake text are combined mid-sentence make it almost certainly an intentionally designed hoax, rather than an accident.

Most of the text does not appear in the actual executive order. In fact, safe deposit boxes held by individuals were not forcibly searched or seized under the order, and the few prosecutions that occurred in the 1930s for gold "hoarding" were executed under different statutes.

The US Treasury also came into possession of a large number of safe deposit boxes due to bank failures. During the 1930s, over 3000 banks failed, and the contents of their safe deposit boxes were remanded to the custody of the Treasury. If no one claimed the box, it remained in the possession of the Treasury. In October 1981, there were 1605 cardboard cartons in the basement of the Treasury, each carton containing the contents of one unclaimed safe deposit box.

Similar laws in other countries
In Poland, a similar regulation was issued on November 7, 1919, which forced citizens to sell their gold and silver to the state. A month later, it was extended until January 31, 1920.

In Australia, Part IV of the Banking Act 1959 allows the Commonwealth government to seize private citizens' gold in return for paper money where the Governor-General is satisfied that it is expedient so to do, for the protection of the currency or of the public credit of the Commonwealth. On January 30, 1976, the operation of that part of the Act was suspended.

United Kingdom introduced the gold trade ban law in 1966 (Exchange Control Act 1947). It became illegal for UK residents to continue to hold more than four gold coins dated after 1817, or to buy any gold coins unless they obtain collector licence from Bank of England. The reasoning was to prevent people from hoarding the gold, while the cost of living and inflation increase. This act was repealed in 1971.

See also

 Causes of the Great Depression
 Emergency Banking Act March 9, 1933
 Executive Order 6814, a similar Order pertaining to silver, signed in 1934
 Fiat money
 Gold
 Gold Clause Cases
 Great Contraction
 Gold Standard

References

External links

Text of Executive Order 6102 from The American Presidency Project.
1933 Audio of FDR's Banking Crisis Fireside Chat

6102
1933 in law
Gold legislation
Federal Reserve System
1933 in economics
Gold in the United States